Jane Wymark (born 31 October 1952) is an English actress. The daughter of English actor Patrick Wymark (1926–1970) and the American writer and playwright Olwen Wymark, she is best known for playing Morwenna Chynoweth Whitworth (Morwenna Carne by the close of the series) in the 1970s BBC television period drama Poldark (1977), and more recently as Joyce Barnaby (1997–2011) in the ITV detective series Midsomer Murders. She has appeared in television dramas such as The Bass Player and the Blonde, A Touch of Frost, Dangerfield, Lovejoy and Pie in the Sky. She also appeared as Jill Mason in the Birmingham Rep production of Equus.

External links 
 
 
 

1952 births
Living people
British people of English descent
British people of American descent
British people of Finnish descent
English people of American descent
English people of Finnish descent
Alumni of the University of Birmingham
English television actresses
Actresses from London